Lan Su Chinese Garden, formerly the Portland Classical Chinese Garden and titled the Garden of Awakening Orchids, is a walled Chinese garden enclosing a full city block, roughly  in the Chinatown area of the Old Town Chinatown neighborhood of Portland, Oregon, United States.  The garden is influenced by many of the famous classical gardens in Suzhou.

History
In the early 1980s an effort was started to build a Chinese garden in Portland, and in 1988 Suzhou and Portland became sister cities. Portland mayor Vera Katz continued those efforts in the 1990s and assisted in the non-profit group that operates the garden in finding a site for a garden. The garden was designed by Kuang Zhen and built by 65 artisans from Suzhou on land donated by NW Natural on a 99-year lease; groundbreaking occurred in July 1999, and construction was completed 14 months later at a cost of about $12.8 million. 500 tons of rock, including Chinese scholar's rocks from Lake Tai (Taihu stone), were brought from China and used in the garden. The garden's grand opening was on September 14, 2000. The construction of the central lake has created problems at times, such as leakage and one case of three visitors fallen into it.

In 2010, to mark the 10-year anniversary of the garden, the garden was renamed to Lan Su Chinese Garden. Su represents Suzhou and Lan represents Portland.

Features
About 90% of the plants featured in the garden are indigenous to China.  However, no plants were brought from China due to import bans. Instead, many plants were found in gardens and nurseries in Oregon, having grown from plants brought over before the import ban. Some plants in the garden are as old as 100 years. There are over a hundred trees, orchids, water plants, perennials, bamboos, and unusual shrubs located throughout the garden. In total there are more than 400 species. The dominant feature is the artificial Lake Zither at the center of the garden.

It includes examples of a number of structures common to Chinese gardens, including covered walkways (lang), bridges (qiáo), and structures such as:
Celestial Hall of Permeating Fragrance (a xuan, or scholar's studio for practicing the Four Arts of the Chinese Scholar);
Flowers Bathing in Spring Rain (a shuixie, or water-side pavilion);
Painted Boat in Misty Rain (a fáng, or boat-shaped pavilion):
Moon Locking Pavilion (a tíng, or stopping place); and
Tower of Cosmic Reflection (a lóu, or two-storied building).

See also 

 List of botanical gardens in the United States
 List of Chinese gardens
 History of Chinese Americans in Portland, Oregon

References

External links

 Lan Su Chinese Garden Official Website

2000 establishments in Oregon
Botanical gardens in Portland, Oregon
Chinese-American culture in Portland, Oregon
Chinese gardens
Northwest Portland, Oregon
Old Town Chinatown
Parks in Portland, Oregon